Piastowo  is a village in the administrative district of Gmina Lubaczów, within Lubaczów County in the Subcarpathian Voivodeship. It is in south-eastern Poland, near the border of Ukraine.

The village has a population of 185.

References

Piastowo